Agaribacter marinus  is a Gram-negative, mesophilic, aerobic, rod-shaped and motile bacterium from the genus of Agaribacter which has been isolated from surface seawater from Muroto in Japan.

References 

Alteromonadales
Bacteria described in 2014